CHQM-FM (103.5 FM) is a Canadian radio station in Vancouver, British Columbia. It broadcasts with an effective radiated power of 100,000 watts from a transmitter on Mount Seymour and airs an adult contemporary format. It is western Canada's oldest and one of the most-listened-to commercial FM stations in Vancouver along with sister station CFBT-FM. It is owned by Bell Media. CHQM's studio is located at 750 Burrard Street in Downtown Vancouver.

CHQM is now the largest adult contemporary station in Canada not locally owned, having overtaken from Montreal's CFQR-FM in February 2011 after that station switched ownership from Toronto's Corus Entertainment to Montreal's Cogeco.

CHQM-FM is currently the most-listened-to radio station in Vancouver with a 12.4% share, according to BBM's Winter report.

The station is carried on Shaw Direct channel 509, and also carried on Telus Optik TV channel 7025.

History
CHQM-FM signed on the air on August 10, 1960 with a mainly instrumental easy listening format, several months after its original AM sister station, CHQM (whose programming CHQM-FM mainly simulcast), first went on-air on December 7, 1959. The original owner of CHQM-AM and -FM was Vancouver Broadcast Associates Ltd., headed by Bill Bellman and Jack Stark, with the stations' studios and offices, then located on 1134 Burrard Street.

On November 4, 1961, CHQM-FM began broadcasting in stereo, and was authorized by the Board of Broadcast Governors (predecessor of the Canadian Radio-television and Telecommunications Commission) to increase its transmission power from 18,950 watts to 100,000 in 1963. The transmitter site was moved from Grouse Mountain to Mount Seymour at this time. CHQM-FM was the second private radio station in Canada to transmit in stereo (after CFRB-FM/Toronto), and it was the first in the nation to transmit an SCMO subcarrier ("Q Music"). This subcarrier was used to transmit background music to stores and businesses throughout the Lower Mainland, and it helped support the FM station during the difficult first two decades when FM audiences were small. Parent company Vancouver Broadcast Associates changed its corporate name to Q Broadcasting Ltd. on August 23, 1969.

The two owners had a dispute, and each struggled to control Q Broadcasting through the mid-1970s. In 1979, Stark assumed complete control of the company. Bellman moved on to become a major shareholder in fledgling CKVU-DT, also in Vancouver.

CHUM Limited acquired CHQM-AM and -FM on October 17, 1990, on condition from the CRTC that CHUM sell either CHQM-AM or its other Vancouver AM station, CFUN (regulations of the time allowed media companies to own only one AM and one FM station in a particular market in Canada); CHQM-AM was sold, while the FM made a gradual switch from its longtime beautiful music format to its current format over a six-month period between March and September of 1992, giving Vancouver two adult contemporary stations (the other being CKKS, now CJAX-FM).

Vancouver ended up with three AC stations by 1996, when Star 104.9 was expanded to Vancouver. The three-way AC battle ended in 1999, when Rogers acquired the station and changed to alternative rock. CKKS-FM switched formats to "Jack FM" on Boxing Day 2002, leaving CHQM-FM as the sole AC in Vancouver (with an exception from 2006-2008). On July 12, 2006, CTVglobemedia announced it would acquire CHUM Limited, which includes CHQM-FM. The transaction was approved by the CRTC (on condition that CKVU, which had also been acquired by CHUM in 2001, be sold to Rogers Communications) on June 8, 2007, and CHQM-FM became a CTVglobemedia station on June 22. On September 21, 2008, in order for the Jim Pattison Group's later launch of 100.5 The Peak, rival AC station CKCL-FM flipped to classic hits, making CHQM once again the only AC station in the market. Although KAFE in Bellingham, Washington has an adult contemporary format, and is easily receivable in Vancouver, the station itself does not target the Vancouver area.

By 2010, sister station CJMJ-FM in Ottawa dropped the remaining 1960s songs, although, for a time, 1960s songs could still be found on CHQM. They have since dropped these as of 2013. Currently, CHQM-FM competes against Rogers Radio's adult hits CJAX-FM and Stingray Group's cluster of soft AC CHLG-FM and hot AC CKZZ-FM, as well as adult album alternative rival CKPK-FM.

On December 27, 2020, as part of a mass format reorganization by Bell Media, CHQM rebranded as Move 103.5, ending 60 years of the "QM FM" branding. While the station would run jockless for the first week of the format, on-air staff would return on January 4, 2021.

Contests
The most famous contest on CHQM is their game "Beat the Bank" in which players will call in. The lucky caller would get to open "vaults". When they choose to open the "vaults", they hear the sound effect of a creaking door. Once they open the very first door, they have a voice saying an amount of money, in which they get to choose or say that they would like to keep opening vaults to get a larger amount of money. Each door gives a larger sum. If they open a vault with the alarm sounding, they lose all their money and therefore do not receive any money as a prize; however, the station will provide losing contestants with a gift certificate. After the player either loses or chooses an amount of money, every vault is explored until the alarm sounds. The last vault opened before the alarm is discovered is announced as the maximum possible prize that could have been claimed during that session. Other contests when players call in, players usually have to answer a question or a series of questions to win a prize, which are usually tickets to go see a concert live in Vancouver.

HD Radio
In 2016, CHQM signed on HD Radio services, marking the first Bell Media station to do so. They also signed on HD2 and HD3 sub-channels, which air simulcasts of sisters CKST and CFTE, respectively.

References

External links
Move 103.5
 

HQM
HQM
HQM
Radio stations established in 1960
1960 establishments in British Columbia